Traumtänzer is the seventh studio album by the German Medieval folk rock band Schandmaul. It was released on 28. January 2011 on CD, double vinyl record, and as extended edition (containing the CD and a "making of" DVD).

In cooperation with Fantasy author Wolfgang Hohlbein the track "Geas Traum [Gea's dream]" references his novel Infinity – Der Turm  which was published in February 2011.

Reception

A review in the German edition of Metal Hammer lauded the diversity of emotions within the different songs and concluded that the creative pause since the predecessor album Anderswelt had been used well by Schandmaul. The Sonic Seducer magazine called the album innovative and sovereign and also noted a certain tranquility that had come from the band's hiatus.

Chart performance
Traumtänzer peaked at position 4 in the German Media Control Charts, at position 10 in the Austrian Top 75 album charts and at position 36 in the Swiss Albums Top 100.

Track listing

References

Schandmaul albums
2011 albums